Maha Bhoga Marga (Main Road Towards Prosperity) is an advocacy and empowerment foundation established by the Protestant Christian Church (GKPB) in Bali, Indonesia in 1980. The Marga Foundation (MBM) is a nonprofit that aims to improve the socio-economic conditions of rural communities through small scale economic and health development programs. Since its inception, this foundation has been helping the underprivileged in Bali, with their efforts aiming to empower and improve standards of living, such as helping people to start savings accounts, take out loans and use working capital. MBM manages multiple outlets. This extensive list includes 7,600 orphanages (that care for children, educational institutions, from playgroups to high school students and vocational school with about 5,910 people), as well as the High School of Tourism Management Tourism Training and Education Center program. The services that MBM provides allowed the foundation to be awarded as a social organization in Bali by the central government.

The Director of the MBM is Mr Rev Ketut Sudiana.

Areas of work 
MBM’s work falls broadly under two divisions – Economic Empowerment and Environmental Preservation. MBM runs seminars on improving agriculture and organises self-help groups, including ones that promote female economic empowerment. For the environmental preservation part of its mission, MBM partnered with the Indonesian government to establish the ‘Clean and Green’ program. MBM encourages people who would like to volunteer to help in their work to contact them or UnitingWorld. Those with medical training or other applicable expertise are welcome but spots are available for those who help teach English or even pick up rubbish.

Vision and mission 
MBM’s mission is to release the weak, suppressed and underdeveloped people to become a prosperous community, to love God’s creatures and all creation. Its vision is to be a noble way for the people that leads to prosperity.

References

 Organizations established in 1980
 Organizations based in Bali
 Religious organizations based in Indonesia